Tilloclytus neiba is a species of longhorn beetle in the Cerambycinae subfamily. It was described by Lingafelter in 2011. It is known from the Dominican Republic.

References

Anaglyptini
Beetles described in 2011